Arki is a village in the Arki CD block in the Khunti Sadar subdivision of the Khunti district in the Indian state of Jharkhand.

Geography

Location                      
Arki is located at

Area overview 
In the adjacent map the area shown is “undulating and covered with hills, hillocks and jungles (jungles/ forests are shown as shaded area in the map). The soil of the area is rocky, sandy and red loam upland. There are paddy fields only in the depressions. In 2011, it had a density of population of 210 persons per sq km. Khunti is an overwhelmingly rural district with 91.5% of the population living in rural areas. Places in this area include Ulihatu, the birthplace of Bhagwan Birsa Munda, and Dombari Buru, the central point of his activity.

Note: The map alongside presents some of the notable locations in the district. All places marked in the map are linked in the larger full screen map.

Civic administration

Police station 
There is a police station at Arki.

CD block HQ 
The headquarters of Arki CD block are located at Arki village.

Demographics 
According to the 2011 Census of India, Arki had a total population of 2,469, of which 1,207 (49%) were males and 1,262 (51%) were females. Population in the age range 0–6 years was 320. The total number of literate persons in Arki was 1,617 (75.24% of the population over 6 years).

(*For language details see Arki block#Language and religion)

Education 
Krishna Ballabh High School Murmu is a Hindi-medium coeducational institution established in 1961. It has facilities for teaching from class IX to class XII. The school has a playground and a library with 1,600 books.

Kasturba Gandhi Balika Vidyalaya is a Hindi-medium girls only institution established in 2005. It has facilities for teaching from class VI to class XII. The school has a playground, a library with 1,969 books and has 9 computers for learning and teaching purposes.

Model School Arki is a Hindi-medium coeducational institution established in 2010. It has facilities for teaching from class VI to class X. The school has a playground.

Project Girls High School is a Hindi-medium girls only institution established in 1984. It has facilities for teaching from class VI to class X. The school has a playground and a library with 426 books.

Healthcare 
There is a Community Health Centre at Arki and Primary Health Centres in Tubid and Birbanki. There are 22 Health Sub Centres in Arki block.

References 

Villages in Khunti district